Formula Maruti is a single-seater, open-wheel class in motorsport made and raced in India. Many of the top teams in Indian motorsports have run in the series, including Team Lakshmi Mills Superspeeds, Team JK, Team MRF, Gabriel Racing, WSRF Racing, McDowell Racing, and Team Valvoline. Top Indian drivers have started their career racing in Formula Maruti, most notably Narain Karthikeyan, Parthiva Sureshwaren, Karun Chandhok and other drivers who have had quite a successful outing in this form are Ajay Kini, Mohit Aryan, Goutham Parekh, Devang Shah, Narendhran, Sudarshan Rao, Kartik Shankar.

Design
The car was a brainchild of S. Karivardhan who wanted an affordable single seater that can be highly economical to run/own, as well as being a stepping stone to several new drivers. It made its debut in 1988 at the Sholavaram races in Chennai. Young drivers in India often begin their competitive careers in Formula Maruti, or after a few years in Karting. Formula Maruti provides drivers with their first insights of a racecar, their first racecar experience, and this is where they cut their teeth in racecar set-up.

Engine
The engine and gearbox are from Maruti 800 car, which is an 800 cc 3-cylinder engine. This series is a regular in the Indian motorsport scene ever since its launch in 1988. The chassis is a spaceframe monocoque with FRP body panels.

Teams
WSRF
Rams Racing

Champions

See also
Formula Rolon
Formula LGB Hyundai
Formula LGB Swift
Formula Rolon Chevrolet

External links
thehinduimages.com

References

Formula racing series
Formula racing
Indian racing cars
One-make series